This is a list of the longest-running television programmes in the United Kingdom.

Running

Ended

See also
 List of longest-running United States television series
 List of longest-running U.S. cable television series
 List of longest-running U.S. primetime television series
 List of longest-running U.S. first-run syndicated television series
 List of longest-running U.S. broadcast network television series
 List of longest-running Australian television series
 List of longest-running Indian television series
 List of longest-running Philippine television series
 List of longest-running Spanish television series
 List of television series canceled after one episode

Notes

References

Longest running
Longest running
Television series
UK